The 2014 edition of the POC-PSC Philippine National Games was held in Manila on May 17 to 23, 2014. The Philippine Air Force won the championship.

Pools composition

Venue
 Arellano University, Taft Avenue, Pasay
 Ninoy Aquino Stadium, Manila

Pool standing procedure
Match won 3–0 or 3–1: 3 points for the winner, 0 points for the loser
Match won 3–2: 2 points for the winner, 1 point for the loser
In case of tie, the teams will be classified according to the following criteria:
number of matches won, sets ratio and points ratio

Preliminary round

Pool A

|}

|}

Pool B

|}

|}

Pool C

|}

|}

Pool D

|}

|}

Final round

Semifinals

|}

3rd-place match

|}

Final

|}

Final standing

Awards

Most Valuable Player
Alnakran Abdilla (Philippine Air Force
Best Attacker
Peter Torres (National University Bulldogs)
Best Blocker
AJ Pareja (TVM-Systema)
Best Server
Jeffrey Malabanan (Philippine Air Force)

Best Setter
Jessie Lopez (Philippine Air Force)
Best Receiver
Raffy Mosuela (Philippine Air Force)
Best Digger
Joseph Tipay
Best coach
Jasper Jimenez

References

External links
 Official Website

Volleyball in the Philippines
Sports in Manila
2014 in Philippine sport
2014 in volleyball
May 2014 sports events in the Philippines